KLIX may refer to:

 KLIX-FM, a radio station (96.5 FM) licensed to Twin Falls, Idaho, United States
 KLIX (AM), a radio station (1310 AM) licensed to Twin Falls, Idaho, United States
 Klix (company), a producer of vending machines
 Klix airfield, a German airfield used for gliders
 Klix.ba, a Bosnian-Herzegovinian online media outlet